Szajna is a Polish-language family name. The surname may refer to:

Józef Szajna (1922-2008), Polish set designer, director, play writer, theoretician of the theatre, painter and graphic artist
Jadwiga Szajna-Lewandowska (1912–1994), Polish pianist, music educator and composer
Janusz C. Szajna (born 1954), Polish entrepreneur and university professor

Polish-language surnames